"Move Right Out" is a pop soul song performed by English singer Rick Astley and written by Astley and Rob Fisher. It was produced by Gary Stevenson and Astley. The song was recorded for Astley's third album, Free, his first album without Stock Aitken Waterman companion. It was released as the album's second single on 25 March 1991 by RCA Records. 

The single peaked at number 58 in UK charts. The song is written in the key of G minor.

Track listing
12" single and CD maxi
 "Move Right Out" (7" Version) – 3:54
 "Move Right Out" (12" Mix) – 6:35
 "Move Right Out" (Vox, Piano, Strings Mix) – 3:35

7" single
 "Move Right Out" (Radio Mix) – 3:53
 "Cry for Help" (Edit) – 4:03

Mini CD single
 "Move Right Out" – 3:53
 "Move Right Out" (Vox, Piano, Strings Mix) – 3:34

Cassette single
 "Move Right Out" (Radio Remix) – 3:54
 "The Bottom Line" – 5:13

Personnel 
 Rick Astley – lead vocals 
 Rob Fisher – acoustic piano 
 Dave West – synthesizers, organ
 Robert Ahwai – guitars 
 Hywel Maggs – guitars 
 Lars Danielsson – bass 
 Per Lindval – drums 
 Jacob Andersen – percussion 
 Larry Williams – saxophones 
 Bill Reichenbach Jr. – trombone 
 Larry Hall – trumpet 
 Jerry Hey – brass arrangements 
 Anne Dudley – string arrangements and conductor 
 Carol Kenyon – backing vocals 
 Dee Lewis – backing vocals

Chart performance

References
Move Right Out single at Rickastley.co.uk

1991 singles
1991 songs
Rick Astley songs
Songs written by Rick Astley
Songs written by Rob Fisher (British musician)
RCA Records singles